Marek Grzegorz Magierowski (born 12 February 1971) is a Polish journalist, columnist, politician and diplomat; since 2021 ambassador to the United States and from 2018 to 2021 ambassador to Israel.

Life 
Magierowski was born in the Lower Silesian town of Bystrzyca Kłodzka and graduated from Hispanic Studies at the Adam Mickiewicz University in Poznań (1994). He wrote his thesis on Camilo José Cela.

For over 20 years he worked as a reporter, editor and columnist, covering mostly international relations. He was deputy head of the economic desk in Gazeta Wyborcza, head of the foreign affairs desk and the business section of the weekly Newsweek Polska, deputy editor-in-chief of Rzeczpospolita (2006–2011). He was also affiliated with Do Rzeczy.

In October 2015 he started working for the Chancellery of the President of the Republic of Poland as an expert on public diplomacy and, in December 2018, he was appointed as a press officer. From June 2017 to May 2018 he served as Undersecretary of State at the Ministry of Foreign Affairs. In June 2018 he became Ambassador Extraordinary and Plenipotentiary of the Republic of Poland to the State of Israel. He ended his term in 2021. On 23 November 2021 he began his service as an ambassador to the United States.

He is married to Anna Ornatowska-Magierowska, has two children. Apart from Polish, he is fluent in English, French, German, Spanish, Italian, Portuguese, Catalan, and Hebrew.

Works 
Books

References 

1971 births
Living people
People from Bystrzyca Kłodzka
Ambassadors of Poland to Israel
Ambassadors of Poland to the United States
Polish columnists
Polish journalists
Adam Mickiewicz University in Poznań alumni